The Game Boy Color (commonly abbreviated as GBC) is a handheld game console, manufactured by Nintendo, which was released in Japan on October 21, 1998 and to international markets that November. It is the successor to the Game Boy and is part of its product line. Critics like IGN consider it more akin to a hardware revision than a next generation product.

The GBC features a color screen rather than monochrome, but it is not backlit. It is slightly thicker and taller and features a slightly smaller screen than the Game Boy Pocket, its immediate predecessor in the Game Boy line. As with the original Game Boy, it has a custom 8-bit processor made by Sharp that is considered a hybrid between the Intel 8080 and the Zilog Z80. The American English spelling of the system's name, Game Boy Color, remains consistent throughout the world.

The Game Boy Color is part of the fifth generation of video game consoles. The Game Boy and the Game Boy Color combined have sold 118.69 million units worldwide making them the third-best-selling system of all time.

On March 23, 2003, the Game Boy Color was discontinued, shortly after the release of the Game Boy Advance SP. Its best-selling game is Pokémon Gold and Silver, which shipped 23 million units worldwide.

History 

Development for the Game Boy Color began in 1996, when Nintendo received requests from game developers for a more sophisticated handheld platform, who said that even the latest iteration of the original system, the Game Boy Pocket, had insufficient hardware. Nintendo developed the console concurrently with Project Atlantis. The resultant product was backward compatible with all existing Game Boy software, a first for a handheld system, allowing each new Game Boy product launch to begin with a significantly larger game library than any of its competitors.

Nintendo formally announced the release of the Game Boy Color on 10 March 1998.

Production of the Game Boy Color was discontinued on March 23, 2003.

Hardware

Technical specifications 

The technical specifications for the console are as follows:

Game Paks manufactured by Nintendo have the following specifications:

 ROM: 8 MB maximum
 Cartridge RAM: 128 KB maximum

Without additional mapper hardware, the maximum ROM size is 32 KB (256 kbit).

The processor, which is a hybrid Intel 8080 and Zilog Z80 workalike made by Sharp with a few extra (bit manipulation) instructions, has a clock speed of approximately 8 MHz, twice as fast as that of the original Game Boy. The Game Boy Color has three times as much memory as the original (32 KB system RAM, 16 KB video RAM). The screen resolution is the same as the original Game Boy at 160×144 pixels.

The Game Boy Color features an infrared communications port for wireless linking. The feature is only supported in a small number of games, so the infrared port was dropped from the Game Boy Advance line, to be later reintroduced with the Nintendo 3DS, though wireless linking would return in the Nintendo DS line using Wi-Fi. The console is capable of displaying up to 56 different colors simultaneously on screen from its palette of 32,768 (8×4 color background palettes, 8x3+transparent sprite palettes), and can add basic four-, seven- or ten-color shading to games that had been developed for the original 4-shades-of-grey Game Boy. In the 7-color modes, the sprites and backgrounds are given separate color schemes, and in the 10-color modes the sprites are further split into two differently-colored groups; however, as flat black (or white) was a shared fourth color in all but one (7-color) palette, the overall effect is that of 4, 6, or 8 colors. This method of upgrading the color count results in graphic artifacts in certain games; for example, a sprite that is supposed to meld into the background is sometimes colored separately, making it easily noticeable. Manipulation of palette registers during display allows for a rarely used high color mode, capable of displaying more than 2,000 colors on the screen simultaneously.

Color palettes 

For dozens of select Game Boy games, the Game Boy Color has an enhanced palette built-in featuring up to 16 colors—four colors for each of the Game Boy's four layers. If the system does not have a palette stored for a game, it defaults to the "Dark green" palette. However, at power-up, one of 12 built-in color palettes is selectable by pressing a directional button and optionally A or B while the Game Boy logo is present on the screen.

These palettes each contain up to ten colors. In most games, the four shades displayed on the original Game Boy translate to different subsets of this 10-color palette, such as by displaying movable sprites in one subset and backgrounds in another. The grayscale (Left + B) palette produces an appearance similar to that experienced on the original Game Boy, Game Boy Pocket, or Game Boy Light.

Games with special palettes include:

 Donkey Kong
 Golf
 Kirby's Dream Land
 Kirby's Dream Land 2
 Kirby's Pinball Land
 Metroid II: Return of Samus
 Pokémon Red and Blue
 Pokémon Yellow (original Game Boy version)
 Super Mario Land
 Super Mario Land 2: 6 Golden Coins
 Tetris
 Wario Land: Super Mario Land 3

A few games used a scan-line color switch technique to increase the number of colors available on-screen to more than 2,000. This "Hi-Color mode" was used by licensed developers including 7th Sense. Some examples of games using this technique are The Fish Files, The New Addams Family Series, and Alone in the Dark: The New Nightmare. Cannon Fodder uses this technique to render full motion video segments in the introduction sequence, ending, and main menu screen.

Cartridges 

Game Boy Color exclusive games are housed in clear-colored Game Pak cartridges. They are shaped differently than original Game Boy Game Paks. Notably, these cartridges lack a notch that prevented the original Game Paks from being removed while the original Game Boy was powered on due to a plastic piece attached to the power switch, which would slide over the notch, locking a cartridge inside the system during gameplay (although some special cartridges like Kirby Tilt 'n' Tumble do include this notch). The lack of this notch keeps original Game Boy systems loaded with Game Boy Color cartridges from powering on. Similarly, Game Boy Pocket, Super Game Boy, Super Game Boy 2, and Game Boy Light will power on when loaded with a Game Boy Color cartridge but will refuse to load the game and will display a warning message stating that a Game Boy Color system is required. This same warning message can be viewed on an original Game Boy as well if the piece that slides into the notch is cut out of the Game Boy. Some Game Boy cartridges such as Chee-Chai Alien and Pocket Music cannot be played on Game Boy Advance and Game Boy Advance SP systems. When inserted and powered on, these systems will exhibit a similar error message and will not load the game. Black cartridges are backwards compatible, playable on the original Game Boy.

Model colors 
The logo for Game Boy Color spells out the word "COLOR" in the five original colors in which the unit was manufactured: Berry (C), Grape (O), Kiwi (L), Dandelion (O), and Teal (R).

Another color released at the same time was "Atomic Purple", made of a translucent purple plastic similar to the color available for the Nintendo 64 controller. Other colors were sold as limited editions or in specific countries.

Games 

Due to its backward compatibility with Game Boy games, the Game Boy Color's launch period had a large playable library. The system amassed a library of 576 Game Boy Color games over a four-year period. While the majority of the games are Game Boy Color exclusive, approximately 30% of the games released are compatible with the original Game Boy.

Tetris for the original Game Boy is the best-selling game compatible with Game Boy Color, and Pokémon Gold and Silver are the best-selling games developed primarily for it. The best-selling Game Boy Color exclusive game is Pokémon Crystal.

The last Game Boy Color game ever released is the Japanese exclusive Doraemon no Study Boy: Kanji Yomikaki Master, on July 18, 2003. The last game released in North America is Harry Potter and the Chamber of Secrets, released on November 15, 2002. In Europe the last game released for the system is Hamtaro: Ham-Hams Unite!, on January 10, 2003.

Launch games

Reception

Sales 

The Game Boy and Game Boy Color were both commercially successful, selling a combined 32.47 million units in Japan, 44.06 million in the Americas, and 42.16 million in other regions. At the time of its discontinuation in 2003, the combined sales of the Game Boy were the best-selling game console of all time. Surpassed in sales by the Nintendo DS and PlayStation 2, the pair are now the third-best-selling console and the second-best-selling handheld of all time. Sales of the console were in part driven by the success of Pokémon Gold and Silver and Pokémon Crystal, with combined sales of 29.5 million units, making them one of the best selling-video games of all time.

Sales of the Game Boy Color were strong at launch. Nintendo of America reported a sale of one million units from launch to December 1998, and two million by July 1999. Retail chains in the United States reported unexpectedly high demand for the console, with executives of FuncoLand reporting "very pleasant and unpredicted" sales and Electronics Boutique stating "the entire Game Boy Color line just exploded, including accessories" upon release. Faced with high worldwide demand and competitive retail pricing, retailers such as CompUSA sold out of Game Boy Color stock in the weeks before the 1998 Christmas season.

Critical reception 

Reception of the Game Boy Color was positive, with critics praising the addition of color and improved clarity of the display. Affiliated publications such as Total Game Boy praised the handheld for its "bright, colorful picture that can be viewed in direct light", backward compatibility features preserving the "vast catalogue of original Game Boy games", and improved technical performance. Computer and Video Games praised the Game Boy Color for making the Game Boy library of games "look better than ever - everything is crystal clear, bright and in colour". Writing for GameSpot, Chris Johnston stated that the display was "crystal clear" and free of motion blur, stating that Tetris DX was the "killer app" of the launch titles on the platform. Milder reviews included those by Arcade, who conceded that the colors were "not as eyeball-popping as you might have hoped for...it's mostly seaweed greens, rusty browns, timid yellows and the like", and that "nothing about it is very radical".

Legacy 

Commentary on the legacy of the Game Boy Color has been shaped by the perception that the handheld was as an incremental and transitional upgrade of the Game Boy rather than a completely new handheld release. In a history of Nintendo, author Jeff Ryan noted the Game Boy Color had a reputation as a "legacy machine" that found success mostly due to its backward compatibility, as "few wanted to lose all the Dr. Mario and Pokémon cartridges they had amassed over the years." Quoted in Retro Gamer, Blitz Games Studios developer Bob Pape acknowledged that although "backwards compatibility more or less defined (the) Game Boy Color", the handheld "ticked all the right boxes with regards to size, battery life, reliability and most importantly backwards compatibility".

Positive assessment on the legacy of the Game Boy Color has also focused upon the merits of its game library, particularly for its third-party and import titles. Travis Fahs for IGN noted whilst "the Game Boy Color's life was relatively brief", it "built up a small library of excellent games", including Wario Land 3 and Pokémon Gold and Silver, and a "unique" and "previously unheard of" line of successful third-party games, including Dragon Warrior Monsters, Metal Gear Solid and Yu-Gi-Oh! Dark Duel Stories. Ashley Day of Retro Gamer noted that the handheld had an "overlooked" status, stating "the Game Boy Color (has) an unfair reputation as the one Nintendo handheld with few worthwhile titles, but this simply isn't the case...returning to the Game Boy Color now reveals a wealth of great games that you never knew existed, especially those available on import."

See also 

 List of Game Boy accessories

Notes

References

External links 

 
 Game Boy Color at Nintendo.com (archived versions at the Internet Archive Wayback Machine)
 
 Nintendo Announces Full Color Game Boy - ROME (March 10, 1998)

1990s toys
2000s toys
Backward-compatible video game consoles
Discontinued handheld game consoles
Fifth-generation video game consoles
Game Boy consoles
Handheld game consoles
Products and services discontinued in 2003
Products introduced in 1998
Regionless game consoles
Z80-based video game consoles

de:Game Boy#Game Boy Color